Charghat Milan Mandir Vidyapith  is a higher secondary school in the village of Charghat, North 24 parganas in the Indian state of West Bengal. The school was established in 1948.

Academic affiliation
The school is affiliated with the West Bengal Board of Secondary Education for secondary education and West Bengal Council of Higher Secondary Education for its higher secondary education.

Subjects offered 
Bengali
English
History
Geography
Physics
Chemistry
Mathematics
Philosophy
Economics
Political Science
Sanskrit
Computer Science
Computer Application
Biology

References

External links
http://www.schoolspedia.com/website/charghat-milan-mandir-vidyapith-north-24-parganas

High schools and secondary schools in West Bengal
Schools in North 24 Parganas district
Educational institutions established in 1948
1948 establishments in West Bengal